Arturo Farías Barraza (September 1, 1927 – October 19, 1992) was a Chilean footballer who played for Colo-Colo and Santiago Morning of Chile and in the Chile national football team in the FIFA World Cup Brazil 1950.

Titles
 Colo-Colo 1953 and 1958 (Chilean Championship)

Notes

External links
 Profile at FIFA.com

1927 births
1992 deaths
Chilean footballers
Chile international footballers
Chilean Primera División players
Santiago Morning footballers
Colo-Colo footballers
1950 FIFA World Cup players
Association football defenders